, sometimes translated as Milky Way Railroad, Night Train to the Stars or Fantasy Railroad in the Stars, is a classic Japanese fantasy novel by Kenji Miyazawa written around 1927. Four versions are known to be in existence, with the last one being the most famous among Japanese readers.

The novel was adapted as a 1985 anime film of the same title as well as various stage musicals and plays.

Plot summary
Giovanni is a lonely boy, whose father is away on a long fishing trip, while his mother is ill at home. As a result, the young Giovanni must undertake paid jobs before and after school, delivering papers and setting type at the printers, in order to provide food for his poor family. These adult responsibilities leave him with no time to study or socialize, and he is ridiculed by his classmates. Apart from Giovanni's mother and sister, the only person who really cares for him is his former playmate Campanella, whose father is a close friend of Giovanni's father.

During a lesson about the galaxy, the teacher asks Giovanni what the Milky Way is made of. Giovanni knows it is formed of stars, but is unable to say so, and Campanella does the same to save Giovanni from further teasing by the rest of the class. At the end of the lesson, the teacher encourages all the children to attend the festival of stars that evening. Upon returning home, Giovanni finds that no milk was delivered that day, so he heads out to the dairy to fetch it for his mother's dinner. Giovanni only encounters an elderly woman at the dairy, and once he pleads that his ill mother needs her milk that night, the woman advises him to come back later.

Giovanni intends to watch the festival with Campanella, but on his way into town, he is mocked by his schoolmates for expecting an otter-skin coat from his father. Upset by this taunt, Giovanni flees from the town. He walks alone to the top of a nearby hill and lies on the ground at the base of a "weather wheel" (天気輪). As he gazes up at the Milky Way in the sky above, Giovanni suddenly finds himself with Campanella on board a steam train, which travels past the Northern Cross and many other stars in its journey across the galaxy. The two boys witness many amazing sights and meet various people, including scholars excavating a fossil from sands of white crystal, and a man who catches herons to turn them into candy.

When a ticket inspector appears, Giovanni discovers he has a rare ticket which allows him to go anywhere that the train runs. Shortly after, the boys are joined in their seats by a tutor and two children, Kaoru and Tadashi, who were on board a ship that sank after hitting an iceberg. As the train passes the flame of Scorpio, Kaoru recalls that it was once a scorpion who ate other insects, but perished in a well after escaping a weasel; regretting that it did not sacrifice itself for a good cause, the scorpion prayed to bring happiness to others in the next life, and its body burst into a bright flame that still burns in the night sky.

The train next stops at the Southern Cross, where all the other passengers disembark for the Christian heaven, leaving only Giovanni and Campanella onboard as the train continues its journey. Giovanni pledges that they should go on together for ever, and vows to follow Scorpio's example of bringing true happiness to everyone. However, as the train approaches the Coalsack - a hole in the sky - Campanella sees what he considers 'the true heaven', where his mother is waiting for him, and suddenly vanishes from the train, leaving Giovanni alone in despair.

Giovanni wakes up on the hilltop, and initially dismisses his journey through the Milky Way as a dream. He heads back to the dairy, where this time he collects a bottle of milk from a farmer, who explains that an escaped calf drank half of the day's milk supply. As Giovanni passes through town on his way home, he learns that Campanella has fallen into the river while saving another boy from drowning. Giovanni hurries to the river, in fear of what he already knows, and finds Campanella's father just as he sadly gives up searching for his son, believing Campanella to have drowned. He tells Giovanni that he has received a letter from his father, announcing that he will be home soon. Continuing homeward to deliver this news and the milk to his mother, Giovanni secretly knows where Campanella went, and vows to stay strong throughout life.

Major themes

After Miyazawa's most beloved sister Toshi died in 1922, Miyazawa, in sorrow, went on a railroad trip to Sakhalin. He started working on this novel soon afterward in 1924, and this trip is said to be the basis of the story. He kept on polishing the work steadily until his death in 1933. The middle part of the novel was never completed but was published as it is nevertheless.

A tribute to those who give themselves to others is a recurring theme throughout the storyline, and according to Hasebe (2000), they are reflections of Miyazawa's philosophy of self-sacrifice, a view appearing in many other juvenile novels of his such as Yodaka no Hoshi and Guskō Budori no Denki. Meanwhile, Suzuki (2004) interprets them as representing a "holistic thought of Ecosystem".

Adaptations

Manga and anime 

Hiroshi Masumura released a manga adaptation of the novel in 1983 with Asahi Sonorama. The protagonists in the manga are anthropomorphic cats. The manga then was made into a 1985 anime film directed by Gisaburo Sugii based on a screenplay by Minoru Betsuyaku. It was released on July 13, 1985, and features Mayumi Tanaka as Giovanni and Chika Sakamoto as Campanella.

Stage adaptations
Playwright Sō Kitamura made the story into a drama titled . Note that 想稿 could be a play on the word  and the character  carrying meanings such as "conception" or "idea". Premièred in 1986, the play was performed by Kitamura's theatrical company Project Navi.

It follows through the episodes in the novel rather briefly. The play also includes some lines by Professor Burukaniro, which appear only in the first three versions of the novel.

Warabiza, a performing arts company in Akita Prefecture, made a musical version of the story. The musical premièred in April 2004 and toured around Japan until March 2007.

Illustrated e-book
Illustrated book with music was launched in 2011 as an application for iPad. Using the final fourth draft of Miyazawa's original as the source text, it has 272 pages. Apple Japan has recommended the Japanese version as an educational application.

Allusions in other works

In the Tōhoku region of Japan where Kenji Miyazawa grew up, there is a real-life train line of similar name: , running from Morioka Station to Metoki Station.
The idea of a steam locomotive running through the stars inspired Leiji Matsumoto to create his famous manga, Galaxy Express 999 (whose literal Japanese title is Ginga Tetsudō 999, possibly in reference to the Japanese title of the novel).
In the manga and anime Doraemon, Nobita Nobi once mistook the novel for being Leiji Matsumoto's manga, since both contain "Ginga Tetsudō" in the title.
The story inspired Going Steady, a Japanese punk rock band, to create the song .
A character in the light novel .hack//AI buster remarks that he took his online handle, Albireo, because he was so affected by Miyazawa's description of the binary star Albireo. The book is referenced once more during a discussion on how much stories can change from the first draft to the final draft, due to the various different versions of Night on the Galactic Railroad.
With the character of Matamune, the wise ghost of a cat often seen travelling by train in the afterlife and in the real world, manga artist Hiroyuki Takei introduced his own vision of Miyazawa's story in the manga Shaman King. The wise cat is even seen reading the book by Miyazawa in tome 19 (chapter 164).
This book is also heavily mentioned and referenced in the anime Hanbun no Tsuki ga Noboru Sora (Looking up at the half-moon), as a book that Akiba Rika's father gave to her.
Yakitate!! Japan has a short mention of the work as illustrated in the reaction of the judge Pierrot, the world class clown, after eating the bread of Shadow who promised it would send him across the galaxy to see his mother. It is shown that the characters mother's favorite book is the same piece of literature; she is shown in a painting holding the book. (This is only in the anime: in the manga, Pierrot is instead transported to the world of Galaxy Express 999, which was adapted from this work.)
In the manga Aria by Kozue Amano, a human character, Akari, imagines that a nighttime train is the Galaxy Express from the novel. The next night she is given a ticket to ride it by a cat and nearly gets on it but donates the ticket to a kitten. Aside from Akari, the conductor and all the passengers are cats, similar to the movie.
Daisuke Kashiwa's song "Stella" is program music based on the novel.
Hikaru Utada's album Heart Station contains a song, "Take 5", which uses this novel as a basis for the lyrics.
Vocaloid producer  has a song titled "For Campanella" (sung by GUMI), based after the novel. GUMI supposedly sings from Giovanni's point of view and the song was written "for" Campanella.
The themes and character's actions of Night on the Galactic Railroad become a major plot point in the anime movie Book Girl.
The 2011 anime Mawaru-Penguindrum makes multiple references to both the book and the anime adaptation throughout, such as the red and blue colors associated with the main characters, the "Scorpion Fire" parable and the apple motif.
In the otome game Hatoful Boyfriend, and its sequel Holiday Star, the novel has been referred to both in the dialogue of the first game and served as the basis of the main plot in the second.
 Since 2014, the railway operator JR East operates a steam-hauled excursion train called the SL Ginga on the Kamaishi Line in the Tohoku region, inspired by the novel.
  Night on the Galactic Railroad is the first play the titular character of the manga Kasane performs in by stealing her friend's face for one night, when she's a high school student. The play and the character's stellar performance as Giovanni will impact future developments and be referenced several times in the story afterwards.
   The story and characters of Giovanni's Island have a deep connection to the book, referencing it several times to the point where characters are playing scenes of their counterparts in Miyazawa's story. The protagonist's names, Junpei and Kanta, originate from "Giovanni" and "Campanella" respectively.
 Campanella is alluded to in Ryohgo Narita's light novel series Baccano!, in which one of his protagonists in the novels Ironic Light Orchestra and Crack Flag is named Monica Campanella. She also bears a similar fate to the original Campanella.
 The novel is referenced several times in the 2015 film Maku ga Agaru, starring the Japanese idol group Momoiro Clover Z, besides being the main play that make the characters in the film.
In the eroge Wagamama High Spec, a play based on the book is written and performed by characters of the game.
 In Over the Garden Wall, two brothers narrowly avoid being hit by a train only to fall into a river where they nearly drown, in allusion to the film's themes of both death by drowning and a train to the afterlife. There is also a bell that becomes significant in the film's final scene; Campanella is Italian for "bell".
 In the visual novel A Sky Full of Stars, the book is mentioned in dialogue in relation to a character's eyes (Amanogawa Saya) and the double star Albireo.
 In Shunji Iwai's 2016 film, A Bride for Rip Van Winkle, the book is mentioned by the protagonist as being her favorite when it is shown that her nickname for a social media account is "Campanella". 
 In the mobile game Magia Record, a spinoff to the anime Puella Magi Madoka Magica, there are multiple references to the book. For example, the doppels of the main characters Iroha and Yachiyo are named Giovanna and Campanella.
In the manga Act-Age, the main character, Yonagi Kei, and other secondary characters perform a theatre play version of the story, with Kei as Campanella.
In the visual novel Wonderful Everyday, an entire scene is a reference to the book.
Stray Sheep by Kenshi Yonezu contains a song titled "Campanella" named after a character in the novel. The lyrics are from the point of view of Zanelli (one of the bullies) after Campanella sacrifices himself to save him from drowning.
 In episode 5 of the anime adaptation of Karakai Jōzu no Takagi-san (Teasing Master Takagi-san), Takagi is seen reading a copy of the book in the library before helping Nishikata study for a test.
 DJ Unit Lyrical Lily from D4DJ released a song titled . The lyrics depict scenes from the novel.

See also 
 1927 in science fiction
 Guskō Budori no Denki

Notes 
1.A short pillar with a horizontal prayer wheel set in a slot at the center. These were once installed in Buddhist graveyards and were ostensibly used for communicating with the spirits of the dead.

References

External links

Novel-related
As copyright for the novel has expired in Japan (and most of the world), Aozora Bunko distributes full text of the novel for free.
 Kadokawa Bunko version  (Aozora Bunko)
 Shinchō Bunko version  (Aozora Bunko)
 A review by Sabrina Laurent
 A list of English-translated publications

Anime adaptations

Theatrical adaptations
Warabiza
Caramelbox 

1934 children's books
1934 novels
20th-century Japanese novels
Japanese children's novels
Japanese fantasy novels
Japanese novels adapted into films
Novels published posthumously
Trains in fiction
Works by Kenji Miyazawa